is a Japanese jazz drummer and percussionist. He is known as a founding member of the bands Altered States and Sights, as well as his work with composers Otomo Yoshihide and John Zorn.

Biography
During his time as a university student, Yasuhiro Yoshigaki familiarized himself with the jazz music scene in Kansai. He became involved with a number of bands, including Altered States, Date Course Pentagon Royal Garden, Emergency! and Ground Zero. In the 2000s, he performed with composer Otomo Yoshihide and bassist Bill Laswell, recording several albums under the name Soup. He is currently playing with the post-rock band Rovo.

Gallery

Discography
Soup (2003)
Soup Live (2004)
''Gyakuyunyū: Kōwankyoku (2014)

References

External links

1959 births
Living people
Avant-garde jazz musicians
Free improvisation
Japanese experimental musicians
Musicians from Hyōgo Prefecture